Hardware is the third solo studio album by American rock musician Billy Gibbons. The album was released on June 4, 2021, by Concord Records.

Production and recording
Gibbons described the recording process in several interviews.

It was Matt Sorum that rang up out of the clear blue, way back in June, and he said, “I don’t know about you, but I’m ready to do something. And making loud noise is right up our alley, so how would you feel about going out and checking out a new recording studio?” And I said, “Gee whiz! That’s music to my ears! Whaddaya got in mind?” And he said, “Oh, there’s a place out near Joshua Tree.” And I initially suspected that he was referring to Rancho De La Luna, where I had worked with Josh Homme and his Queens of the Stone Age project. But Matt said, “No, it’s right across the highway.” Little did he tell me that it was not only across the highway, but it was 20 miles back into the desert. But sure enough, we teamed up, we went from Palm Springs down the road there, and when we arrived, I thought, “Oh, 30 minutes, we’ll have a look around.” Well, those 30 minutes turned into three months. We walked through the front door, and we didn’t leave until we had wrapped up this album project. And even better was the fact that the studio had already placed a scattering of instruments laying about, because when we arrived, Matt didn’t even have a drum stick, and I didn’t have a guitar pick. But—lo and behold—in the studio, to my delight, they had an old Fender Jazzmaster guitar, leaning up against a Fender reverb tank. And Matt tuned up a set of skins that was in a corner, and off we went. And the first crack outta the box was the single that was released in the last couple of weeks, “West Coast Junkie.”
Gibbons said “We found an old Fender Jazz – ’64 or ’65 – in the studio and everyone had a go...The unusual one was watching Matt step out from behind the drums and slamming down on a bass guitar. It was quite a surprise."
“The desert settings, replete with shifting sands, cacti and rattlesnakes makes for the kind of backdrop that lends an element of intrigue reflected in the sounds created out there."The day they got there they were greeted by a pair of rattlesnakes on the porch. In the afternoon they’d sit and watch the eagles fly overhead. “You read about these places, you see travelogue photos, but when you’re there the energy is imbibed,” says Gibbons. “It’s something you feel.”

Critical reception

Hardware received generally positive reviews from critics. At Metacritic, which assigns a normalized rating out of 100 to reviews from critics, the album received an average score of 80, which indicates "generally favorable reviews", based on 6 reviews.

Track listing

All songs written by Billy Gibbons, Matt Sorum, Mike Fiorentino and Chad Shlosser except where noted.

Personnel

Billy Gibbons - vocals, guitars, bass guitar, 'virtual' bass
Austin Hanks - guitars, bass guitar, 'virtual' bass
Matt Sorum – drums, bass guitar
Larkin Poe - vocals on "Stackin' Bones"

Charts

Weekly charts

Year-end charts

References

2021 albums
Concord Records albums